Aerobic conditioning is a process whereby the heart and lungs are trained to pump blood more efficiently, allowing more oxygen to be delivered to muscles and organs.

Aerobic conditioning is the use of continuous, rhythmic movement of large muscle groups to strengthen the heart and lungs (cardiovascular system). Improvement in aerobic conditioning occurs when athletes expose themselves to an increase in oxygen uptake and metabolism, but to keep this level of aerobic conditioning, the athletes must keep or progressively increase their training to increase their aerobic conditioning.

Aerobic condition is usually achieved through cardiovascular exercise such as running, swimming, aerobics, etc. A stronger heart does not pump more blood by beating faster but by beating more efficiently, primarily by having an increased stroke volume and left ventricular mass. Trained endurance athletes can have resting heart rates as low as the reported 28 beats per minute in people such as Miguel Indurain or 32 beats per minute of Lance Armstrong, both of whom were professional cyclists at the highest level.

Cardiovascular conditioning 
Aerobic conditioning trains the heart to be more effective at pumping blood around the body, it does this in a multitude of ways:
 Increasing the stroke volume of the heart (how much blood the heart is pumping per beat)
 Increasing the diameter of the blood vessels, which allows for more blood to be moved through the body, which in turn allows for more oxygen to be diffused into the muscle cells.
 Increasing the size of the heart chambers, enlarging the heart so it can hold and pump more blood.

Effect of aerobic conditioning on maximum oxygen intake (Vo2) 
Aerobic conditioning has the ability to raise a person's maximum oxygen intake, meaning that they are able to diffuse more oxygen into their blood than they previously could.

Although exercising at lower intensities will improve aerobic conditioning, the most rapid gains are made when exercising close to an individual's anaerobic threshold. This is the intensity at which the heart and lungs can no longer provide adequate oxygen to the working muscles and an oxygen debt begins to accrue; at this point the exercise becomes anaerobic. Aerobic training intensity for most individuals will be <85-92% of maximum heart rate.

Once improvement in aerobic conditioning is apparent, for example in metabolism and oxygen uptake, the body will progressively adapt to further training. Aerobic conditioning can be anywhere from walking on the treadmill to mowing the lawn. The average healthy person should engage in 150–200 minutes of moderate aerobic exercise every week. This amount of physical activity should help with maintaining a healthy weight and keeping the cardiovascular system in good condition.

Aerobic conditioning has many benefits to overall health as it can increase physical endurance and lifespan. During aerobic training, the aim is to improve the blood flow to the lungs, heart, and blood vessels. This particular type of training targets large muscle groups so that as the intensity of physical activity is increased, overall fitness is improved. There are many benefits to aerobic training, and the outcomes can be very rewarding. Aerobic conditioning can increase the duration that one can endure physical activity. High-intensity activities in team-sports are performed more efficiently when athletes undergo aerobic conditioning, as they will be able to effectively deliver blood and oxygen to tissues. This type of conditioning can help with heart disease, diabetes, or anxiety. Aerobic conditioning also has many non-medical benefits, such as improving mood, alleviating fatigue and stabilizing sleeping patterns. This overall type of conditioning has the most longevity to its practice and can improve a person's health and general well-being immensely.

References

Kearns, K. (2011). Aerobic exercise and FASD. University of Victoria, Retrieved from https://web.archive.org/web/20130426020412/http://web.uvic.ca/~fasd/?q=node%2F25
Cooper, Kenneth C. The New Aerobics. Eldora, Iowa: Prairie Wind.
Donatelle, Rebecca J. Health: The Basics. 6th ed. San Francisco: Pearson Education, Inc. 2005.
Hinkle, J. Scott. School Children and Fitness: Aerobics for Life. Ann Arbor, MI: ERIC Clearinghouse on Counseling and Personnel Services.

See also
 Cardiorespiratory fitness

Aerobic exercise